Hossein Tavakkoli (born January 10, 1978, in Mahmoudabad, Mazandaran) is an Iranian weightlifter who won the gold medal in the Men's 105 kg weight class at the 2000 Summer Olympics. In 2017, he start training Ehsan Hadadi, an olympic silver medalist in discus throwing, for 2020 Olympic Games preparation.

Major result

References 

 

1978 births
Living people
Iranian male weightlifters
Iranian strength athletes
Olympic weightlifters of Iran
Weightlifters at the 2000 Summer Olympics
Olympic gold medalists for Iran
Asian Games bronze medalists for Iran
Olympic medalists in weightlifting
Asian Games medalists in weightlifting
Weightlifters at the 1998 Asian Games
Weightlifters at the 2002 Asian Games
Medalists at the 2000 Summer Olympics
Medalists at the 2002 Asian Games
People from Mahmudabad, Mazandaran
Sportspeople from Mazandaran province
20th-century Iranian people
21st-century Iranian people